Hugo Ariel Sconochini (born 10 April 1971) is an Argentine-Italian former professional basketball player. He played at the shooting guard and small forward positions.

Professional career
He won the EuroLeague championship in 1998 and 2001, with the Italian League club Virtus Bologna. In the 1996–97 season, Sconochini played with the Greek Basket League club Panathinaikos, and with them, he won the FIBA Intercontinental Cup in September 1996.

National team career
Sconochini was a regular on Argentina's senior national team, with which he won a gold medal at the 2004 Summer Olympics, and a silver medal at the 2002 FIBA World Championship.

References

External links
Euroleague.net Profile
Eurobasket.com Profile
Italian League Profile 
Spanish League Profile 

1971 births
Living people
1998 FIBA World Championship players
2002 FIBA World Championship players
Argentine expatriate basketball people in Spain
Argentine men's basketball players
Argentine people of Italian descent
Basketball players at the 2004 Summer Olympics
Italian expatriate basketball people in Spain
Italian men's basketball players
Liga ACB players
Medalists at the 2004 Summer Olympics
Olimpia Milano players
Olympic basketball players of Argentina
Olympic gold medalists for Argentina
Olympic medalists in basketball
Pallacanestro Virtus Roma players
Panathinaikos B.C. players
Saski Baskonia players
Shooting guards
Small forwards
Viola Reggio Calabria players
Virtus Bologna players
Sportspeople from Santa Fe Province